Jariet Waldina Paz (born 15 June 1966 in Tegucigalpa) is a Honduran journalist and politician. She currently serves as deputy of the National Congress of Honduras representing the Liberal Party of Honduras for Francisco Morazán.

References

1966 births
Living people
People from Tegucigalpa
Honduran journalists
Honduran women journalists
Liberal Party of Honduras politicians
Deputies of the National Congress of Honduras
21st-century Honduran women politicians
21st-century Honduran politicians
21st-century Honduran women writers
21st-century Honduran writers
20th-century Honduran women writers
20th-century Honduran writers